Senegalese people in France consist of migrants from Senegal and their descendants living and working in France.

History

Before World War II                   

Before World War II, Senegalese in France were a huge minority. The first Senegalese people in France were mostly Senegalese Tirailleurs who served France in World Wars and who settled in France after war. There were also navigators in ports and Senegalese students in French universities.
There were also Senegalese domestic workers in France at that time.

After World War II                  
From the late 19th to the early 20th centuries, the Senegal River valley experienced a great deal of climate change. Because there were few industries in Senegal, people emigrated to France to find jobs.
The first wave of Senegalese immigration to France took place, like other sub-Saharian waves, around 1964.

Notable people                      
 Patrick Vieira, footballer
 Abdou Diallo, footballer
 Ibrahima Diallo, footballer
 Bafétimbi Gomis, footballer
 Aïssa Maïga, actress
 Benjamin Mendy, footballer
 MHD, rapper
 Omar Sy, actor
 Rama Yade, politician
 Mamadou Sakho, footballer
 Ferland Mendy, footballer
 Youssouf Sabaly, footballer
 Kalidou Koulibaly,  footballer
 Édouard Mendy,  footballer
Bernard Mendy,  footballer
 Akon, singer

References                           

Society of France
 
African diaspora in France
Immigration to France by country of origin
Senegalese diaspora